Henry Augustus Stearns (October 23, 1825 – October 8, 1910) brought steam laundry to California, was a cotton wadding mill owner in Rhode Island, and a Lieutenant Governor of Rhode Island.

Early life
Stearns was born October 23, 1825, in Billerica, Massachusetts, the seventh generation of an old New England family which traced its ancestry back to Isaac Stearns, who settled in Watertown, Massachusetts from England in 1630. He attended Phillips Academy for two years, then worked as a shoemaker and as a clerk in a general store until he was 20 years old. Before long, Stearns moved to Cincinnati, Ohio, to join his brother George S. manufacturing cotton wadding, in the first such factory west of the Allegheny Mountains.

Wandering years
In 1850, Henry, feeling wanderlust, sold out his interest in the cotton wadding factory to his brother, and headed to California to join in the gold rush. He decided he would transport a steam boiler and machinery, with the intent to start a steam laundry in San Francisco. This required a land transport across the isthmus of Panama on the backs of men, then a sea voyage on an old whaling ship which sprang a leak, became disabled and set adrift. By the time the crew arrived in San Francisco four months later, the Stearns and the crew were near-starving. A doctor told Stearns he would not live. However, Stearns did recover. He set up the first steam laundry in California, became very successful, and then sold his share. He then moved on to operate a steam ferry boat named "Hector" between San Francisco and Oakland. He then moved on to the redwoods district and opened a steam sawmill.

In 1853, Stearns returned to Cincinnati, then moved a few more times, including Buffalo, New York and then Sangamon County, Illinois.

Rhode Island
In 1861, Stearns moved to the state where he would remain the rest of his life: Rhode Island. There, he teamed with Pawtucket industrialist Darius Goff, manufacturing cotton wadding at the Union Wadding Company. Stearns became superintendent of the company in 1870, and president in 1891.

Political life
Stearns was a lifelong Republican. He represented Lincoln in both houses of the State Legislature; first from 1878 to 1881 and again from 1887 to 1888. He was Lieutenant Governor of Rhode Island from 1891 to 1892.

Personal life
Stearns married Kate Falconer of Hamilton, Ohio in 1856. Their children were: Deshler Falconer, George Russell, Walter Henry, Kate Russell, Justice Charles Falconer Stearns, Henry Foster, Anna Russell, who died in infancy, and Caroline. After 1862, the Stearns family lived in Central Falls, Rhode Island. His personal library was said to be among the finest in the state.

Stearns was a Mason; a member of the Sons of the American Revolution; and a member of the Society of Colonial Wars. He was also a member of the Central Falls Congregational Church.

External links

References

1825 births
1910 deaths
Burials at Swan Point Cemetery
People from Central Falls, Rhode Island
People from Billerica, Massachusetts
Lieutenant Governors of Rhode Island
American Congregationalists
American people of English descent
American Freemasons
Sons of the American Revolution
Phillips Academy alumni
19th-century American politicians